George W. Slack (April 2, 1874 – March 17, 1950) was an American farmer and politician.

Born in the Town of Smelser, Grant County, Wisconsin, Slack farmed near Big Patch, Wisconsin. Slack served on the town board and the Platteville, Wisconsin Common Council. He also served on the Grant County Board of Supervisors, the school board, and road commission. In 1923 and 1925, Slack served in the Wisconsin State Assembly and was a Republican. Slack died at his home in Platteville, Wisconsin.

Notes

1874 births
1950 deaths
People from Smelser, Wisconsin
Farmers from Wisconsin
Wisconsin city council members
County supervisors in Wisconsin
School board members in Wisconsin
Republican Party members of the Wisconsin State Assembly